This list of Dutch writers includes authors who have written works in the Dutch language.

In cases where the writer uses a pseudonym, the real name is added between brackets.

Netherlands writers and poets

A-B

Bertus Aafjes
Kader Abdolah
Gerrit Achterberg
Carel Steven Adama van Scheltema
Jan van Aken
Joseph Albert Alberdingk Thijm
Arnold Aletrino
Robert Anker
Jan Arends
A. C. Baantjer
Marijn Backer
Sevtap Baycılı
Beatrice of Nazareth 
Thea Beckman
Nicolaas Beets 
J. Bernlef (Hendrik Jan Marsman)
Cornelis de Bie
Paul Biegel
Aristide von Bienefeldt
Maarten Biesheuvel 
Carli Biessels
J.C. Bloem
Marion Bloem
Godfried Bomans
Ferdinand Bordewijk
Anna Louisa Geertruida Bosboom-Toussaint
Hafid Bouazza 
Menno ter Braak
Hugo Brandt Corstius
Gerbrand Adriaensz Bredero
Jan ten Brink
Jeroen Brouwers
Boudewijn Büch 
Jacob Buyens van Mol
Conrad Busken Huet

C-F

Jan Campert
Remco Campert
Simon Carmiggelt
Jacob Cats
Isabelle de Charrière
Antoon Coolen
Igor Cornelissen
Willy Corsari
Louis Couperus
Rudi van Dantzig
P.A. Daum
Aagje Deken
Maria Dermoût
Lodewijk van Deyssel (K.J.L. Alberdingk Thijm)
Adriaan van Dis 
Johnny van Doorn 
Renate Dorrestein
Bart FM Droog
Imme Dros
Frederik van Eeden
Jan Eekhout
Justus van Effen
Margriet Ehlen
Marcellus Emants 
Jan Fabricius
Johan Fabricius
Louis Fles (Dr. W. Bottema C.Az.)
Anne Frank

G-H

Ida Gerhardt
Wim Gijsen
Theo van Gogh
Herman Gorter
Hermine de Graaf
Arnon Grünberg
Robert van Gulik
Lale Gül 
Halil Gür
Jacob Haafner
Hella Haasse
Hadewych
Maarten 't Hart
Jan de Hartog
Havank
Simon Heere Heeresma
Willem Frederik Hermans
Willy van der Heide (Willem van den Hout) 
A.F.Th. van der Heijden
Herman Heijermans
Hildebrand (Nicolaas Beets)
Etty Hillesum
Hinrek van Alckmer
Wim Hofman
Pieter Corneliszoon Hooft
Conrad Busken Huet
Constantijn Huygens

J-L

Arthur Japin
Jacques de Kadt
George Kettmann
Piet J. Kroonenberg
Richard Klinkhamer
Willem Kloos
Gerrit Komrij
Hans Koning
Rudy Kousbroek
Tim Krabbé
Gerrit Krol
Eric de Kuyper 
Theo Lalleman
Jacob van Lennep
Jacobus van Looy
Lucebert (L.J.Swaanswijk)

M-R

Philips van Marnix van Sint-Aldegonde
Cissy van Marxveldt
Ischa Meijer 
Willem de Mérode 
Nicolaas Matsier (Tjit Reinsma)
Dora van der Meiden-Coolsma
Marga Minco (Sara Voeten-Minco) 
Jan Mulder
Harry Mulisch
Multatuli (Eduard Douwes Dekker)
Nescio (J.H.F.Grönloh)
Carel van Nievelt (Gabriël, J. van den Oude)
Cees Nooteboom
Henri Nouwen
Martinus Nijhoff
Inte Onsman
Olga Orman
Piet Paaltjens (François Haverschmidt)

Johannes Hendricus van der Palm
Connie Palmen
Edgar du Perron
Marianne Philips
Gerard Reve
Adriaan Roland Holst 
Tomas Ross
Maarten van Rossem
Renate Rubinstein

S-Z

Annet Schaap
Arthur van Schendel
Bert Schierbeek
Annie M. G. Schmidt
Abraham Louis Schneiders
Anja Sicking
Arend Fokke Simonsz
J. Slauerhoff
Hendrik Laurenszoon Spiegel
F. Springer
Hilda van Stockum
Melis Stoke
Jan Terlouw 
Felix Thijssen
Marten Toonder
Bob den Uyl
M. Vasalis (Margaretha Drooglever Fortuyn-Leenmans) 
Pauline van de Ven
Simon Vestdijk
Stephanie Vetter
Roemer Visscher
Joost van den Vondel
Anne de Vries
Theun de Vries
Leo Vroman 
Simon de Waal
Hans Warren 
Siebren van der Werf
Henri van Wermeskerken
Janwillem van de Wetering
Willem Wilmink
Leon de Winter
Justine Constance Wirix-van Mansvelt
Betje Wolff
Jan Wolkers
Sadik Yemni
Joost Zwagerman

Flemish writers and poets

A-D

Frank Adam
Roger Avermaete
Pieter Aspe
Fernand Auwera (Fernand Van der Auwera)
Aster Berkhof (Lode Van Den Bergh) 
Louis Paul Boon
Herman Brusselmans
Cyriel Buysse
Ernest Claes
Paul Claes
Hugo Claus
Rosiana Coleners
Hendrik Conscience
Johan Daisne (Herman Thiery)
Cornelis de Bie
Herman De Coninck
Rita Demeester
Roger M.J. De Neef
Filip De Pillecyn 
Freddy de Vree
Astère M. Dhondt
Gaston Durnez

E-K
Willem Elsschot (Alfons de Ridder)
Jef Geeraerts
Guido Gezelle
Marnix Gijsen 
Maurice Gilliams 
Jan Hammenecker
Georges Hebbelinck 
Kristien Hemmerechts 
Stefan Hertmans 
Emmanuel Hiel
Guido van Heulendonk
Jotie T'Hooft
Eric de Kuyper

L-T

Hubert Lampo
Tom Lanoye
Rosalie Loveling
Virginie Loveling
Patricia de Martelaere
Bob Mendes 
Ivo Michiels
Wies Moens
Erwin Mortier
Jan van Nijlen
Leonard Nolens
Joris Note
Paul van Ostaijen 
Monika van Paemel
Ivo Pauwels
Leo Pleysier 
Anne Provoost
Hugo Raes
Daniel Robberechts
Albrecht Rodenbach
Willy Roggeman
Maria Rosseels
Ward Ruyslinck (Raymond Charles Marie de Belser)
Clem Schouwenaars
Paul Snoek
Lucienne Stassaert
Stijn Streuvels
Herman Teirlinck
Felix Timmermans

U-Z

Jos Vandeloo 
Walter van den Broeck
Roger van de Velde
Karel van de Woestijne 
Geert van Istendael 
Karel van Mander
Eddy Van Vliet 
Hendrik van Veldeke
Paul Verhaeghen
Peter Verhelst
Dimitri Verhulst 
Eriek Verpale
Cornelis Columbanus Vrancx 
Carla Walschap
Gerard Walschap 
Paul De Wispelaere
Marie van Zeggelen
Lode Zielens

Surinamese writers and poets
Albert Helman 
Cynthia McLeod  
Trefossa (Henri Frans de Ziel)

Antillian writers and poets
Tip Marugg 
Frank Martinus Arion

See also
 List of Dutch women writers
 List of Belgian women writers

References

 
Dutch-language writers